Mika Kuisma (1967 – 11 January 1995) was a Finnish orienteering competitor. He died in a car crash.

He finished 3rd overall in the Orienteering World Cup in 1994, behind winner Petter Thoresen and Janne Salmi. He finished 25th in the World Cup 1992.

He competed at the 1991 World Orienteering Championships in  Marianske Lazne, where he finished 8th in the short course, and 17th in the classic distance. At the 1993 World Orienteering Championships in West Point, he received a bronze medal in relay with the Finnish team, and finished 19th in the classic distance.

See also
 Finnish orienteers
 List of orienteers
 List of orienteering events

References

1967 births
1995 deaths
Finnish orienteers
Male orienteers
Foot orienteers
World Orienteering Championships medalists